Lucas Musculus (born 16 January 1991) is a German football player who plays for Mittelrheinliga club SV Eintracht Hohkeppel as a forward.

External links

1991 births
Living people
Association football forwards
German footballers
1. FC Köln II players
TuS Koblenz players
FC Viktoria Köln players
Bonner SC players
KFC Uerdingen 05 players
2. Bundesliga players
Regionalliga players
3. Liga players
Oberliga (football) players